"I Guess the Lord Must Be in New York City" is a song written and recorded by singer-songwriter Nilsson in 1969. 
A track from his fourth studio album, Harry, it became his second charting single.

Background
The song was written for, but not included in, the movie Midnight Cowboy. The same recording was reissued in 1972 crediting Buck Earl, (Jon Voight's character in the movie was Joe Buck.) as the performing artist.

Chart performance
It became Nilsson's second hit record in the U.S., reaching No. 34 on the Billboard Hot 100 chart and No. 7 on the Easy Listening chart.

The song was a bigger hit in Canada, where it reached No. 25 on the Pop chart and No. 3 on the Adult Contemporary chart.

Notable cover versions
"I Guess the Lord Must Be in New York City" was covered by Sagittarius in 1969. Their version reached number 135 on the U.S. Billboard Bubbling Under the Hot 100 chart.
A version by Wayne Newton reached number 28 on the US Easy Listening chart in the fall of 1969.

Popular culture
The track was used in a film – 1971's La Mortadella (US title: Lady Liberty), starring Sophia Loren. 
It was also featured in the 1998 movie You've Got Mail starring Tom Hanks and Meg Ryan.

References

External links
 

1969 singles
Harry Nilsson songs
American soft rock songs
1969 songs
RCA Victor singles
Songs about New York City
Songs written for films
Songs written by Harry Nilsson